Eddie Muller (born October 15, 1958) is an American writer based in San Francisco. He is known for his books about movies, particularly film noir, and is the host of Noir Alley on Turner Classic Movies (TCM).

Early life and education
Muller is the son of famous San Francisco boxing writer Eddie Muller.

Muller studied with filmmaker George Kuchar at the San Francisco Art Institute in the late 1970s.

Career

Muller is the founder and president of the Film Noir Foundation and is co-programmer of the San Francisco Noir City film festival. Muller is considered a film noir expert and is called on to write and talk about the genre, notably on wry commentary tracks for Fox's series of film noir DVDs and introducing Turner Classic Movies's weekly Saturday night "Noir Alley" movie feature. 

Laura Sheppard, director of events at Mechanics' Institute in San Francisco, dubbed him "The Czar of Noir" The quote is often misattributed to the novelist James Ellroy.

Muller based the character of Billy Nichols in his period crime novel "The Distance" (2002) after his father. The character returned in Muller's 2003 novel Shadow Boxer.

Personal life
Muller married Kathleen Marie Milne.

Honors
 Nominated for the Edgar Allan Poe Award for best critical/biographical work, Mystery Writers of America (1999) for "Dark City: The Lost World of Film Noir"
 Won the Best First Novel award of the Private Eye Writers of America (2002) for The Distance
 Nominated for the Edgar Allan Poe Award for best critical/biographical work, Mystery Writers of America (2003) for "The Art of Noir: The Posters and Graphics from the Classic Era of Film Noir"
 Nominated for the Shamus Award for Best P.I. First Novel (2003) for "The Distance"

Books

Nonfiction
(with Daniel Faris) Grindhouse: The Forbidden World of "Adults Only" Cinema (1996); 
Dark City: The Lost World of Film Noir (1998); 
Dark City Dames: The Wicked Women of Film Noir (2001); 
The Art Of Noir: The Posters & Graphics From The Classical Era Of Film Noir (2004); 
(with Tab Hunter) Tab Hunter Confidential: The Making of a Movie Star (2005); 
Gun Crazy: The Origin of American Outlaw Cinema (2014); 
Dark City: The Lost World of Film Noir (Revised and Expanded Edition) (2021);

Fiction
The Distance (2002); 
Shadow Boxer (2003);

References

External links
Official web site
Film Noir Foundation

Interview with Matthew Sorrento at Bright Lights Film Journal
Interview with Rudy Cecera for Screen Comment

1958 births
American film historians
American male non-fiction writers
Film theorists
Living people
American film critics
Shamus Award winners
Writers from San Francisco